Bairaag is a 1976 Hindi-language film. Produced by the duo Mushir-Riaz, it is directed by Asit Sen. The film stars Dilip Kumar, who received a Filmfare nomination for Best Actor for playing a triple role. Bairaag also stars Saira Banu, Leena Chandavarkar, Ruma Guha Thakurta, Prem Chopra, Helen, Sujit Kumar, Madan Puri, Paintal, Kader Khan, Asit Sen and Sachin. Its music is by the duo Kalyanji Anandji, who received a Filmfare nomination for Best Music. The film received a Filmfare Award for Best Sound for P. Harikishan. The film failed to perform at the box office. It was Dilip Kumar's third consecutive failure at box-office, the first and only time in his career since Milan (1946). After this film, he went on an indefinite hiatus and returned after 5 years in Kranti (1981).

Plot
Kailash (Dilip Kumar) loses his eyesight after a car accident. His wife gives birth to twin boys, one of them blind. Before his wife gains consciousness, he asks the doctor to get rid of the blind baby, because he doesn't want his son to live a life where he can't see at all. The doctor's wife leaves the blind baby in a Hindu temple, where he is discovered by the temple priest who raises the boy, now called Bholenath (Dilip Kumar). Kailash feels guilty about what he did to the blind baby and confesses it to his wife several years later. She becomes so distraught that she dies.

Kailash raises his other son Sanjay (Dilip Kumar), who turns into a spoiled rich boy. Although Sanjay is engaged to Sonia (Leena Chandavarkar), he continues to have an affair with Lucy (Helen), who has a rich dangerous boyfriend Grasco (Madan Puri). Sonia's greedy brother Kunwar Pratap Singh (Prem Chopra) agrees to marry a country girl Tara (Saira Banu) but wants a Rs. 3,00,000 dowry. She doesn't want to marry him, because she is in love with Bholenath, even though he is poor and blind.

Bholenath thinks that his status is beneath hers and that she deserves a rich suitor. He steals the money from the Hindu temple to give to Kunwal for her dowry. His pet snake tries to stop him from giving the money by biting him. He regains his sight and vows to the temple priest (Nazir Hussain) and Tara to bring the money back from Kunwal. Once he reaches the city, people mistake him for Sanjay, who in turn, is hiding out with Lucy after she leaves Grasco along with Rs. 15,00,000. She is found dead with the money missing. Sanjay is the suspect. The film is resolved with the real culprit getting caught, the two brothers reunited with their father, and then marrying their sweethearts.

Cast
Dilip Kumar as Kailash / Bholenath 'Bhola' / Sanjay (Triple Role) 
Saira Banu as Tara 
Leena Chandavarkar as Sonia 
Prem Chopra as Kunwar Pratap Singh 
Sujit Kumar as       
Madan Puri as Grasco 
Helen as Lucy 
Kader Khan as Superintendent Of Police
Nasir Khan as Dr. Mishra 
Nazir Hussain as Priest
Paintal as
Ruma Guha Thakurta as Pushpa 
Mukri as Vimla Father 
Kumari Naaz as Vimla 
Purnima as Saraswati Chandrabhan 
Leela Mishra as Tara's Aunty 
Praveen Paul as Mrs. Mishra

Reception and Release 
Bairaag, released in 1976, was the last film of Dilip Kumar as hero, after which he took a five-year break from films and returned to play character roles thereafter. Although it failed at the box office, the critics appreciated it. Dilip Kumar was acclaimed for his triple role and received a Filmfare nomination for Best Actor.

His next films were Kranti directed by Manoj Kumar, Shakti (directed by Ramesh Sippy) and Vidhaata (directed by Subhash Ghai), where Kumar played role of mature characters, leaving romantic roles for younger artists.

Awards 

 24th Filmfare Awards:

Won

 Best Sound Design – P. Harikishan

Nominated

 Best Actor – Dilip Kumar
 Best Music Director – Kalyanji–Anandji

Soundtrack 
The music was composed by Kalyanji-Anandji and all songs of the film were memorable numbers. The lyrics were by Anand Bakshi.

References

External links 
 

1976 films
1970s Hindi-language films
Films scored by Kalyanji Anandji